Man on High Heels (lit. "High Heel") is a 2014 South Korean noir film written and directed by Jang Jin, starring Cha Seung-won as a transgender homicide detective.

Plot
Yoon Ji-wook is a hard-as-nails homicide detective known for his undisputed ability to nab violent criminals. He is revered as a legend in the police force and at the same time feared among the mafia for his brutality in cracking down on crime. Yet, beneath his cool, macho appearance lies a secret that he must hide from the world he lives in. Ji-wook was born male, and he has wanted to live his life as a woman since his teenage years. He tries to suppress this inner desire, but in vain. Ji-wook finally reaches the point where he can no longer hide who he truly is, and decides to take the plunge and get a gender affirmation operation. However, before he has a chance to do so, unexpected crises arise and interfere with his plans. A gang that suffered from the cold, hard steel of Ji-wook's handcuffs is dead set on getting their revenge against him. Ji-wook resigns and tries to go about making his dream a reality, but people close to him gets sucked into the revenge plot he finds himself at the center of. When some of those people get killed and a girl named Jang-mi falls into danger, he realizes that he can't stand idly by any longer.

Cast

 Cha Seung-won as Yoon Ji-wook
 Oh Jung-se as Heo Gon
 Esom as Jang-mi
 Song Young-chang as Heo Bul
 Kim Eung-soo as Squad leader Park
 Ahn Gil-kang as Master Park 
 Go Kyung-pyo as Kim Jin-woo
 Lee Yong-nyeo as Bada
 Lee El as Do Do
 Kim Min-kyo as Man 1
 Min Jun-ho as accountant
 Kim Ye-won as Jung Yoo-ri
 Lee Eon-jeong as Joo-yeon 
 Oh Ji-ho as Lee Seok
 Park Sung-woong as Prosecutor Hong
 Yoon Son-ha as Jung Yoo-jung
 Lee Moon-soo as taxi driver
 Kim Byeong-ok as Dr. Jin
 Lee Hae-young as immigration staff member
 Kim Won-hae as elevator resident
 Lee Dong Gil as young Jiwook

Box office
Man on High Heels was released in South Korea on June 4, 2014. Despite its star director and actor, the film underperformed at the box office against Hollywood blockbusters X-Men: Days of Future Past and Edge of Tomorrow. It opened at sixth place on the box office, drawing 338,663 admissions.

Awards

References

External links 
 
 
 

2014 films
2010s Korean-language films
South Korean action films
South Korean LGBT-related films
Transgender-related films
Film noir
Lotte Entertainment films
2014 LGBT-related films
2010s South Korean films